Rita Grande and Émilie Loit were the defending champions but only Grande competed that year with Emmanuelle Gagliardi.

Gagliardi and Grande lost in the quarterfinals to Els Callens and Anne-Gaëlle Sidot.

Cara Black and Elena Likhovtseva won in the final 6–4, 6–1 against Ruxandra Dragomir and Virginia Ruano Pascual.

Seeds
Champion seeds are indicated in bold text while text in italics indicates the round in which those seeds were eliminated.

 Cara Black /  Elena Likhovtseva (champions)
 Els Callens /  Anne-Gaëlle Sidot (semifinals)
 Ruxandra Dragomir /  Virginia Ruano Pascual (final)
 Amy Frazier /  Katie Schlukebir (quarterfinals)

Draw

Qualifying

Seeds
Both seeded teams received byes to the second round.
  Rika Fujiwara /  Sarah Pitkowski (Qualifiers)
  Marta Marrero /  Anabel Medina Garrigues (second round)

Qualifiers
  Rika Fujiwara /  Sarah Pitkowski

Lucky losers
  Kristina Brandi /  Rossana de los Ríos

Draw
 NB: The first two rounds used the pro set format.

References
 2001 ANZ Tasmanian International Doubles Draw

Hobart International – Doubles
Dou